Moutamba is a town in eastern Republic of Congo.

Transport 

It is served by a station on the Mbinda branch of the Congo-Ocean Railway.

See also 

 Railway stations in Congo

References 

Populated places in the Republic of the Congo